Withins Lane railway station was a railway station serving the town of Radcliffe in Lancashire.(now Greater Manchester), England.

History
Since 1879 the area has been served by the station now known as Radcliffe Metrolink station.

References

External links
http://www.johnhigson.org.uk/Radcliffe/railways/

Disused railway stations in the Metropolitan Borough of Bury
Former Lancashire and Yorkshire Railway stations
Railway stations in Great Britain opened in 1847
Railway stations in Great Britain closed in 1849
Railway stations in Great Britain opened in 1850
Railway stations in Great Britain closed in 1851
Radcliffe, Greater Manchester
1847 establishments in England
1849 disestablishments in the United Kingdom
1850 establishments in England
1851 disestablishments in England